Ford is a hamlet in North East Derbyshire in the county of Derbyshire in England.

Location
Ford lies just south of the South Yorkshire border, around 5 miles south-east of Sheffield City Centre, and just a mile south of the village of Ridgeway

History
The hamlet alongside Ridgeway village is estimated to be around 700–800 years old, and would once have been part of Sherwood Forest.

The Ford Farm building is estimated to have been built around 1750, and are grade-II listed.

The hamlet of Birley Hay which lies to the west of Ford also features a number of listed buildings and farm outhouses.

External links
Form Farm history (PDF)
Ridgeway & Ford History

Hamlets in Derbyshire
Eckington, Derbyshire